Brigadier General Thomas Stanwix (1670 – 14 March 1725) was a British Army officer and politician who sat in the House of Commons from 1702 to 1725. He served as Governor of Gibraltar.

Career
Stanwix joined the Army and had become a captain-lieutenant in Hasting's Foot Regiment by 1692. In March 1702 he was elected Member of Parliament for Carlisle. He was appointed Lieutenant-Governor for Carlisle in 1705 and found that his main challenge was stopping the smuggling across the border between England and Scotland.

In 1703, during the War of the Spanish Succession, Stanwix was present at the Battle of Caia in Portugal. In 1711 he became Governor of Gibraltar. Except from a personal perspective he was unsuccessful as a governor, as his main achievement was to become richer than when he arrived. Observers felt that he should have concentrated on encouraging the Dutch to leave so that the benefits of the Capture of Gibraltar (in 1704) could be directed entirely in Britain's direction. Stanwick was tenacious as even when he was replaced by David Colyear he stayed on as lieutenant-governor for some months.

In 1713 Stanwix returned to England and became Mayor of Carlisle for 1715 as well as Deputy Lieutenant of Cumberland, thereby increasing his influence in the Carlisle area. He was a Whig MP who strongly supported Robert Walpole. He lost his seat in Carlisle in 1721 when seeking re-election on appointment to office, and instead became MP for Newport (Isle of Wight). He also became Governor of Kingston-upon-Hull in 1721 until his death. In the 1722 general election he was defeated at Carlisle but was returned as MP for Yarmouth (Isle of Wight).

Stanwix was also Governor of the Royal Hospital Chelsea from 1714 until 1720.

Stanwix died in 1725. He left his estates in Carlisle and Middlesex to his wife, and on her death to his nephew John Roos, on condition that he assumed the surname of Stanwix.

References

 

1670 births
1725 deaths
British military personnel of the War of the Spanish Succession
British MPs 1707–1708
British MPs 1708–1710
British MPs 1710–1713
British MPs 1713–1715
British MPs 1715–1722
British MPs 1722–1727
Deputy Lieutenants of Cumberland
Governors of Gibraltar
Members of the Parliament of Great Britain for English constituencies
Mayors of Carlisle, Cumbria
English MPs 1702–1705
English MPs 1705–1707
Suffolk Regiment officers
Members of the Parliament of Great Britain for Carlisle